Philosophical Library is a United States publisher specializing in psychology, philosophy, religion, and history. It was founded in 1941 by Dagobert D. Runes to publish the works of European intellectuals after the 1930s diaspora in the face of racial and religious discrimination.  It has published works for 22 Nobel Prize winners and other key figures including Albert Einstein, Jean-Paul Sartre, Simone de Beauvoir, Paramahansa Yogananda and Albert Schweitzer.

Philosophical Library’s top sellers include Einstein's Out of My Later Years, Khalil Gibran's Tears and Laughter, Max Planck's Classical Mathematics, and Sartre’s Being and Nothingness.

The company is based in New York City.

Since 2007, the company has reissued out-of-print titles as print-on-demand through Amazon.com.

References

Book publishing companies based in New York (state)
Publishing companies established in 1941